Bangaon subdivision is an administrative subdivision of the North 24 Parganas district in the Indian state of West Bengal.

History
In 1883 Bangaon subdivision was transferred from Nadia district to Jessore district. At the time of Partition of Bengal (1947) the police station areas of Bangaon and Gaighata of Jessore district, forming Bangaon subdivision, were placed in India, and the rest of Jessore district in East Pakistan.

Geography
Bangaon subdivision is part of the Ichhamati-Raimangal Plain, one of the three physiographic regions in the district located in the lower Ganges Delta. It contains soil of mature black or brownish loam to recent alluvium. The Ichhamati flows through the eastern part of the district.

Subdivisions
North 24 Parganas district is divided into the following administrative subdivisions:

Religion
Given below is an overview of the religion-wise break-up of the population across the subdivisions of North 24 Parganas district, as per 2011 census:

North 24 Parganas district with 24.22% Muslims (in 2001) has been identified as a minority concentrated district by the Ministry of Minority Affairs, Government of India. A baseline survey on religious minority population has been carried out under the aegis of Indian Council of Social Science Research and funded by the Ministry of Minority Affairs. For information on the survey see North 24 Parganas: minority concentrated district.

Population movement
North 24 Parganas district is densely populated, mainly because of the influx of refugees from East Pakistan (later Bangladesh). With a density of population of 2,182 per km2 in 1971, it was 3rd in terms of density per km2 in West Bengal after Kolkata and Howrah, and 20th in India. According to the District Human Development Report: North 24 Parganas, “High density is also explained partly by the rapid growth of urbanization in the district. In 1991, the percentage of urban population in the district has been 51.23.”

As per the Refugee Relief and Rehabilitation Department of the Government of West Bengal, the census figures show the number of refugees from East Pakistan in 1971 was nearly 6 million (60 lakhs) and in 1981, the number was assessed at 8 million (80 lakhs). A district-wise break-up in 1971, shows the main thrust of the refugee influx was on 24-Parganas (22.3% of the total refugees), Nadia (20.3%), Bankura (19.1%) and Kolkata (12.9%).

The North 24 Paraganas district has a 352 km long international border with Bangladesh, out of which 160 km is land border and 192 km is riverine border. Only a small portion of the border has been fenced and it is popularly referred to as a porous border. There are reports of Bangladeshi infiltrators. The CD Block pages carry decadal population growth information.

An estimate made in 2000 places the total number of illegal Bangladeshi immigrants in India at 1.5 crore, with around 3 lakh entering every year. The thumb rule for such illegal immigrants is that for each illegal person caught four get through. While many immigrants have settled in the border areas, some have moved on, even to far way places such as Mumbai and Delhi. The border is guarded by the Border Security Force. During the UPA government, Sriprakash Jaiswal, Union Minister of State for Home Affairs, had made a statement in Parliament on 14 July 2004, that there were 12 million illegal Bangladeshi infiltrators living in India, and West Bengal topped the list with 5.7 million Bangladeshis. More recently, Kiren Rijiju, Minister of State for Home Affairs in the NDA government has put the figure at around 20 million.

Administrative units

Bangaon subdivision has 6 police stations including 1 women PS, 3 Community development blocks, 3 panchayat samitis, 38 gram panchayats, 363 mouzas, 355 inhabited villages, 1 municipality and 7 census towns. The municipality is at Bangaon. The census towns are: Chandpara, Chhekati, Sonatikiri, Dhakuria, Chikanpara, Shimulpur and Bara. The subdivision has its headquarters at Bangaon.

Police stations
Bangaon being a border adjacent area, in May 2019,Government of West Bengal has formed Bangaon as a new Police district for better policing and administration, dividing it from Barasat police district. Tarun Halder, was appointed as the first SP of Bangaon. Since its bifurcation, Bongaon is now the smallest Police district having only 6 police stations under its jurisdiction.

Police stations in Bangaon subdivision have the following features and jurisdiction:

Blocks
Community development blocks in Bangaon subdivision are:

Gram panchayats
The subdivision contains 38 gram panchayats under 3 community development blocks:

 Gram panchayats in Bagdah CD Block are: Asharu, Helencha, Malipota, Bagda, Koniara–I, Ranghat, Bayra, Koniara–II and Sindrani.
 Gram panchayats in Bangaon CD Block are: Akaipur, Chhaighoria, Gangrapota, Kalupur, Bairampur, Dharam Pukuria, Ghatbour, Palla, Chawberia–I, Dighari, Gopalnagar–I, Sundarpur, Chawberia–II, Ganganandapur, Gopalnagar–II and Tengra.
 Gram panchayats in Gaighata CD Block are Chandpara, Fulsara, Jaleswar–II, Sutia, Dharmapur–I, Ichapur–I, Jhaudanga, Dharmapur–II, Ichapur–II, Ramnagar, Duma, Jaleswar–I and Shimulpur.

Municipal towns/ cities
An overview of the only municipal city in Bangaon subdivision is given below.

Education
North 24 Parganas district had a literacy rate of 84.06% (for population of 7 years and above) as per the census of India 2011. Bangaon subdivision had a literacy rate of 80.57%, Barasat Sadar subdivision 84.90%, Barrackpur subdivision 89.09%, Bidhannagar subdivision 89.16% and Basirhat subdivision 75.67%.

Given in the table below (data in numbers) is a comprehensive picture of the education scenario in North 24 Parganas district for the year 2012-13:

Note: Primary schools include junior basic schools; middle schools, high schools and higher secondary schools include madrasahs; technical schools include junior technical schools, junior government polytechnics, industrial technical institutes, industrial training centres, nursing training institutes etc.; technical and professional colleges include engineering colleges, medical colleges, para-medical institutes, management colleges, teachers training and nursing training colleges, law colleges, art colleges, music colleges etc. Special and non-formal education centres include sishu siksha kendras, madhyamik siksha kendras, centres of Rabindra mukta vidyalaya, recognised Sanskrit tols, institutions for the blind and other handicapped persons, Anganwadi centres, reformatory schools etc.

The following institutions are located in Bangaon subdivision:

Healthcare
The table below (all data in numbers) presents an overview of the medical facilities available and patients treated in the hospitals, health centres and sub-centres in 2013 in North 24 Parganas district.

.* Excluding nursing homes.** Subdivision-wise break up for certain items not available.

Medical facilities available in Bangaon subdivision are as follows:

Hospitals: (Name, location, beds)
Dr. Jiban Ratan Dhar Subdivisional Hospital, Bangaon, 250 beds 
Bangaon Railway Hospital, Bangaon, 4 beds
Male Vagrants Home (Petrapole), Bangaon, 10 beds

Rural Hospitals: (Name, block, location, beds)
Bagdah Rural Hospital, Bagda, 30 beds
Chandpara Rural Hospital, at Thakurnagar, 30 beds

Block Primary Health Centres: (Name, block, location, beds)
Sundarpur BPHC, Palla, 15 beds

Primary Health Centres: (CD Block-wise)(CD Block, PHC location, beds)
Bagdah CD Block: Nataberia PHC, Mangalganj (6), Sindrani PHC (10), Koniera PHC, Bena (6)
Bangaon CD Block: Akaipur PHC, Garibpur (6), Chowberia PHC (6)
Gaighata CD Block: Gaighata PHC (6), Dharampur PHC (6), Baduria PHC, Ramchandrapur (10), Dr. B.R.Roy PHC, Ghonja (6)

Electoral constituencies
Lok Sabha (parliamentary) and Vidhan Sabha (state assembly) constituencies in Bangaon subdivision were as follows:

References

Subdivisions in North 24 Parganas district